Rasgan is a village in Rewari Tehsil of Rewari district, in the Indian state of Haryana.

Adjacent villages
Khijuri
Masani
Dungarwas
Nikhri on NH 48 (Old NH08)
Masani
Jitpur Istamrar
Khaliawas
Bhatsana
Niganiawas
Raliawas

References

Villages in Rewari district